Leptobunus borealis is a species of harvestman in the family Phalangiidae. It is found in Europe and Northern Asia (excluding China) and North America.

References

External links

 

Harvestmen
Animals described in 1899
Taxa named by Nathan Banks